Hamsadhvani (meaning "the cry of the swan"), is a rāga in Carnatic music (musical scale of Carnatic tradition of Indian classical music). It is an audava rāgam (or owdava rāga, meaning pentatonic scale). It is a janya rāga of the Melakartha raga, Sankarabharanam (29th) but according to Hamsadhvani's prayoga or the way it is sung it is said to be the janya of Kalyani (65th).

Hamsadhvani is also extensively used in Hindustani music and said to be borrowed into it from Carnatic music. It was created by the Carnatic composer Ramaswami Dikshitar (1735–1817), father of Muthuswami Dikshitar (one of the musical trinity of Carnatic music), and brought into Hindustani music by Aman Ali Khan of the Bhendibazaar gharana. It has become popular due to Amir Khan.

Structure and lakshana 

Hamsadhvani does not contain madhyamam or dhaivatham. It is a pentatonic scale (audava-audava ragam in Carnatic music classification – audava meaning 'of 5'). Its  structure (ascending and descending scale) is as follows (see swaras in Carnatic music for details on below notation and terms):

  : 
  : 

The notes used in this scale are shadjam, chatushruti rishabham, antara gandharam, panchamam and kakali nishadam. In Hindustani music, it is associated with Bilaval thaat (equivalent of Shankarabharanam).

Compositions 
Hamsadhvani rāgam lends itself for elaboration and exploration and has many compositions in both classical music and film music. It is usually sung at the beginning of a performance. There are many kritis (compositions) in praise of Lord Ganesha set in this musical scale.

 Jalajaskhiro an adi Talam Varnam
 Gajamukhane Siddhidayakane by Vyasatirtha
 Raghunāyaka,Śrī Raghukula and Abhi‌shta varada by Tyagaraja in Telugu
 Vātāpi Gaṇapatiṃand parvathypathim by Muthuswami Dikshitar in Sanskrit
 Pāhi Śripatē by Swathi Thirunal Rama Varma
 Varanamukha vā by Koteeswara Iyer
 Mūlādhāra mūrti,Karunai seivai','ullam irangi and parasakthi janani by Papanasam Sivan in Sanskrit and Tamil
 Gajavadana beduve by Purandaradasa  in KannadaNammamma Sharade by Kanakadasa in Kannada
 Vināyakā by Veena Kuppayyar in Sanskrit
 Varavallabha Ramaṇa by G. N. Balasubramaniam
 Gaṃ Gaṇapatē by Muthiah Bhagavatar
 Pirai Aniyum Peruman by Dr M. Balamuralikrishna
 Vinayaka Vighnavishaka by R Ganapati
 Sundar Gopālaṃ by Devaki Pandit
 Varuvai Arulvai Shantanayagi by Manachanallur Giridharan 
 Tumbikkai Andavane by Manachanallur Giridharan 
 Vinayaka Ninnu Vina  by E.V. Raamakrishna Bhaagavatar
 Vande Anishamaham by Mysore Vasudevachar
 Bhajamahe Sree Vinayakam by Tulaseevanam
 Arul purivai and Karunai seiguvai by Sudhanandha bharathy

 Film songs 
 Lagi Lagan Pathi Sakhi Sangh from the movie "Meghe Dhaka Tara"

 In Tamil language 

 Related rāgas 

 Graha bhedham Hamsadhvani's notes when shifted using Graha bhedam, yields another pentatonic rāgam, Nagasvaravali. Graha bhedam is the step taken in keeping the relative note frequencies same, while shifting the shadjam to the next note in the rāgam. For more details and illustration of this concept refer Graha bhedam on Hamsadhvani.

 Scale similarities 

 Amritavarshini is a rāgam which has Prati Madhyamam in place of the rishabham. Structures are shown in below table.
 Gambhiranata is a rāgam which has shuddha madhyamam in place of the rishabham. Structures are shown in below table.

 Mohanam is a rāgam which has chatushruti dhaivatam in place of the nishadam. Structures are shown in below table.
 Niroshta is a rāgam which has chatushruti dhaivatam in place of the panchamam. Structures are shown in below table.

 In Hindustani music 

 Vadi and samavadi 
Vadi: Sa

Samavadi: Pa

 Pakad or chalan 
ga pa ni Sa ga re ni pa
Sa
The Pakad is the one where one can identify to which raga does the composition belongs.

 Organization and relationships 
Thaat: Bilaval.

 Time 
Late Evening

 Important recordings 
 Amir Khan, Ragas Hansadhwani and Malkauns, on HMV LP (long-playing record), EMI-EASD1357
 Lagi Lagana (Drut – Teental) by A. Kanan in Meghe Dhaka Tara
 Ja Tose Nahin Bolun Kanhaiya by Lata Mangeshkar in Parivar (1956)

Notes

 References 

 Literature 
 Bor, Joep (ed). Rao, Suvarnalata; der Meer, Wim van; Harvey, Jane (co-authors) The Raga Guide: A Survey of 74 Hindustani Ragas''. Zenith Media, London: 1999.

External links 
 SRA on Samay and Ragas
 SRA on Ragas and Thaats
 Rajan Parrikar on Ragas

Janya ragas